A killer application (killer app) is any computer application software that is so necessary or desirable that it proves the core value of some larger technology, such as its host computer hardware, video game console, software, programming language, software platform, or operating system. Consumers would buy the host platform just to access that application, possibly substantially increasing sales of its host platform.

Examples 

One of the first recognized examples of a killer application is generally agreed to be the VisiCalc spreadsheet, released in 1979 for the Apple II series computer. BYTE wrote in 1980, "VisiCalc is the first program available on a microcomputer that has been responsible for sales of entire systems", and Creative Computings VisiCalc review is subtitled "reason enough for owning a computer". Others also chose to develop software, such as EasyWriter, for the Apple II first because of its increasing sales.

Lotus 1-2-3 similarly benefited sales of the IBM PC. Noting that computer purchasers did not want PC compatibility as much as compatibility with certain PC software, InfoWorld suggested "let's tell it like it is. Let's not say 'PC compatible', or even 'MS-DOS compatible'. Instead, let's say '1-2-3 compatible'." WordStar became the most popular word processor during much of the 1980s.

The UNIX Operating System became a killer application for the DEC PDP-11 and VAX-11 minicomputers during roughly 1975–1985. Many of the PDP-11 and VAX-11 processors never ran DEC's operating systems (RSTS or VAX/VMS), but instead, they ran UNIX, which was first licensed in 1975. To get a virtual-memory UNIX (BSD 3.0), requires a VAX-11 computer. Many universities wanted a general-purpose timesharing system that would meet the needs of students and researchers. Early versions of UNIX included free compilers for C, Fortran, and Pascal, at a time when offering even one free compiler was unprecedented. From its inception, UNIX drives high-quality typesetting equipment and later PostScript printers using the nroff/troff typesetting language, and this was also unprecedented. UNIX is the first operating system offered in source-license form (a university license cost only $10,000, less than a PDP-11), allowing it to run on an unlimited number of machines, and allowing the machines to interface to any type of hardware because the UNIX I/O system is extensible.

Usage 

The first recorded use of the term in print was the May 24, 1988, issue of in PC Week. "Everybody has only one killer application. The secretary has a word processor. The manager has a spreadsheet."

The definition of "killer app" came up during the questioning of Bill Gates in the United States v. Microsoft Corp. antitrust case. He had written an email in which he described Internet Explorer as a killer app. In the questioning, he said that the term meant "a popular application", and did not connote an application that would fuel sales of a larger product or one that would supplant its competition, as the Microsoft Computer Dictionary defined it.

Introducing the iPhone in 2007, Steve Jobs said that "the killer app is making calls". Reviewing the iPhone's first decade, David Pierce for Wired wrote that although Jobs prioritized a good experience making calls in the phone's development, other features of the phone soon became more important, such as its data connectivity and ability to install third-party software (which was added later).

The World Wide Web (through the web browsers Mosaic and Netscape Navigator) is the killer app that popularized the Internet, as is the music sharing program Napster.

Applications and operating systems 
 1979: Apple II: VisiCalc (first spreadsheet program and killer app)
 1983: IBM PC compatible/MS-DOS: Lotus 1-2-3 (spreadsheet)
 1985: Macintosh: Aldus (now Adobe) PageMaker (first desktop publishing program)
 1985: AmigaOS: Deluxe Paint, Video Toaster, Prevue Guide
 1993: Acorn Archimedes: Sibelius

Video games
The term applies to video games that persuade consumers to buy a particular video game console or accessory, by virtue of platform exclusivity. Such a game is also called a "system seller".

 Space Invaders, originally released for arcades in 1978, became a killer app when it was ported to the Atari VCS console in 1980, quadrupling sales of the three-year-old console.
 Star Raiders, released in 1979, may have been a system-seller for the Atari 400 and 800 computers. Another was Eastern Front (1941), released in 1981.
 Defender of the Crown, released in 1986 for the Amiga as the first game from Cinemaware, has graphics which "have set new standards for computer game".
 In 1996, Computer Gaming World wrote that Wizardry: Proving Grounds of the Mad Overlord (1981) "sent AD&D fans scrambling to buy Apple IIs".
 The Famicom home port of Xevious is considered the console's first killer app, which caused system sales to jump by nearly 2 million units.
 Computer Gaming World stated that The Legend of Zelda on the Nintendo Entertainment System, Phantasy Star II on the Sega Genesis, and Far East of Eden for the NEC TurboGrafx-16 were killer apps for their consoles.
 The Super Mario, Final Fantasy, and Dragon Quest series were killer apps for Nintendo's Famicom and Super Famicom consoles in Japan.
 John Madden Footballs popularity in 1990 helped the Genesis gain market share against the Super NES in North America.
 Sonic the Hedgehog, released in 1991, was hailed as a killer app as it revived sales of the three-year-old Genesis.
 Mortal Kombat helped pushed the sales of the Genesis due to being uncensored unlike the Nintendo version.
 Streets of Rage became a system seller for the Mega Drive/Genesis in the UK.
 Street Fighter II, originally released for arcades in 1991, became a system-seller for the Super NES when it was ported to the platform in 1992.
 Donkey Kong Country was another killer app for the SNES, helping Nintendo make a comeback against Sega.
 Myst and The 7th Guest, both released in 1993, drove adoption of CD-ROM drives for personal computers.
Virtua Fighter 2, NiGHTS into Dreams, and Sakura Wars are the killer apps for the Sega Saturn.
Euros 96 and Sega Rally Championship are major system-sellers for the Sega Saturn in the United Kingdom, with the latter becoming the fastest selling CD game.
Die Hard Arcade and Fighters Megamix boosted the Sega Saturn's sales in the United States.
Ridge Racer, Tekken, Wipeout,,Tomb Raider, and Crash Bandicoot are the killer apps for the PlayStation. Tomb Raider was released for the Sega Saturn first and for MS-DOS at the same time, but the games contributed substantially to the original PlayStation's early success. See Blache Fabian & Lauren Fielder and NG Alphas.
Final Fantasy VII is another killer app for the PlayStation. Computing Japan magazine said that it was largely responsible for the PlayStation's global installed base increasing 60% from  units sold by November 1996 to  units sold by May 1997.
Super Mario 64 and GoldenEye 007 are the killer apps for the Nintendo 64. 
Virtua Fighter 3, Sonic Adventure, and The House of the Dead 2 are the killer apps for the Dreamcast.
NFL 2K is a killer app for the Dreamcast in the United States.
Gran Turismo 3 and the Grand Theft Auto games are the killer apps for the PlayStation 2.
Star Wars Rogue Squadron II: Rogue Leader, Super Smash Bros. Melee, and Super Mario Sunshine are the killer apps for the GameCube.
 Halo: Combat Evolved and Halo 2 are the killer apps for the Xbox, and the subsequent series entries became killer apps for the Xbox 360 and Xbox One.
 Many video game and technology critics call Xbox Live a more general killer app for the Xbox.
 Blue Dragon is a killer app for the Xbox 360 in Japan.
 Wii Sports is the killer app for the Wii.
 Metal Gear Solid 4: Guns of the Patriots boosted PlayStation 3 sales.
 Mario Kart 8 is a killer app for the Wii U in the UK.
 The Legend of Zelda: Breath of the Wild is a killer app for the Nintendo Switch.
 Half-Life: Alyx is a killer app for virtual reality headsets, as the first true AAA virtual reality game. Sales of VR headsets such as the Valve Index increased dramatically after its announcement, suggesting users bought the product specifically for the game.
 Microsoft Flight Simulator was called a killer app for Xbox Game Studios's Xbox Game Pass subscription, and the Xbox Series X/S.

See also 
 Disruptive innovation
 Killer feature

References 

Computer jargon
Video game marketing